The 2004 LNBP was the 5th season of the Liga Nacional de Baloncesto Profesional, one of the professional basketball leagues of Mexico. It started on July 1, 2004 and ended on December 8, 2004. The league title was won by Santos Reales de San Luis, which defeated Halcones UV Xalapa in the championship series, 4–2.

Format 
20 teams participate. The teams are divided in 2 groups of 10 teams each, called Zonas (zones): Zona Norte (North) and Zona Sur (South). The first 8 teams of each group qualify for the playoffs. The group playoffs have quarterfinals (best-of-5), semifinals (best-of-7) and finals (best-of-7). The winner of each group series qualify for the championship series (best-of-7), named Campeón de Campeones (Champion of Champions).

Teams

Regular season

Zona Norte standings

Zona Sur standings 

Note: The LNBP website calculates 51 points for Garzas de Plata de la UAEH, thus ranking the team below Coras de la UAN.

Playoffs 
Source

Copa Independencia 
The first edition of the Copa Independencia, a tournament that took place in September, was played between the 8 best ranked teams at the end of the first part of the season. The tournament was won by Lobos de la UAdeC, which defeated Lechugueros de León, 94–88 in the final game played at Gimnasio Hermanos Carreón in Aguascalientes.

Quarterfinals 
 September 5: Lecugueros de León 103, Fuerza Regia de Monterrey 92
 September 5: Halcones UV Xalapa 96, La Ola Roja del Distrito Federal 83
 September 6: Santos Reales de San Luis 105, Cometas de Querétaro 101
 September 6: Lobos de la UAdeC 129, Panteras de Aguascalientes 117 (2OT)

Semifinals 
 September 7: Lechugueros de León 102, Santos Reales de San Luis 89
 September 7: Lobos de la UAdeC 122, Halcones UV Xalapa 116

Final

All-Star Game 
The 2004 LNBP All-Star Game was played in San Luis Potosí at the Auditorio Miguel Barragán on August 31, 2004. The game was played between a team of Mexican players (Mexicanos) and a team of foreign players (Extranjeros). The Mexican won, 111–106.

Teams 

Mexicanos
 Miguel Acuña (Tecos de la UAG)
 Víctor Ávila (Halcones UV Xalapa)
 Enrique González (Halcones UV Xalapa)
 Javier González Rex (La Ola Roja del Distrito Federal)
 Alonso Izaguirre (Lobos de la UAC)
 Horacio Llamas (Lechugueros de León)
 Omar López (Tecos de la UAG)
 Víctor Mariscal (Lobos de la UAC)
 José Portillo (Santos Reales de San Luis)
 Omar Quintero (Fuerza Regia de Monterrey)
 Gabriel Sandoval (Lechugueros de León)
 Enrique Zúñiga (Lechugueros de León)
 Coaches: Ángel González (Halcones UV Xalapa) and Francisco Torres (Lechugueros de León)

Extranjeros
  Boubacar Aw (La Ola Roja del Distrito Federal)
  Devon Ford (Panteras de Aguascalientes)
  Reggie Jordan (Cometas de Querétaro)
  Keenan Jourdon (Correcaminos UAT Victoria)
  Roland Lamont (Correcaminos UAT Matamoros)
  Andre Laws (Halcones UV Xalapa)
  Jason McCutcheon (Lobos de la UAC)
  Tyrone McDaniel (Correcaminos UAT Victoria)
  Matt Mitchell (Panteras de Aguascalientes)
  Antonio Rivers (Fuerza Regia de Monterrey)
  Jamaal Thomas (Santos Reales de San Luis)
 Coaches:  Carlos Díaz Rodríguez (Garzas de Plata de la UAEH) and  Luis Manuel López (Santos Reales de San Luis)

References

External links 
 2004 LNBP season on Latinbasket.com

LNBP seasons
2004 in Mexican sports
2004–05 in North American basketball